Gary James George Noël (born 7 March 1990) is a professional footballer who plays as a forward for Lewes. Born in England, he represents Mauritius at international level.

Club career
Noel started his Millwall before playing in non-league football for Dulwich Hamlet, Thurrock and Lewes amongst others. He then moved to Austria to play for Admira Wacker but featured only for their second team in the Austrian Regionalliga. After a spell with SV Schwechat, Noel joined SKN St. Pölten in 2013 where he went on to score in the final of the 2013–14 Austrian Cup final. He then joined First Vienna FC before moving to Germany to join Regionalliga side VfB Lübeck. After two seasons with Lübeck, Noël joined fellow Regionalliga Nord side SC Weiche Flensburg 08.

On 22 June 2019, Alemannia Aachen announced the signing of Noël on a one-year contract. He left the club two months later to join TuS Rot-Weiß Koblenz. However, he was released on 31 January 2020.

Noël returned to Lewes in February 2020.

International career
Noel is eligible to represent Mauritius through his parentage, his father was born on the African island. He made his international debut against Rwanda on 26 March 2016.

References

External links 

Lewes stats

Living people
1990 births
English people of Mauritian descent
Mauritian footballers
English footballers
Footballers from Greater London
Mauritius international footballers
Association football forwards
National League (English football) players
Regionalliga players
Austrian Regionalliga players
Millwall F.C. players
Dulwich Hamlet F.C. players
Harrow Borough F.C. players
Croydon Athletic F.C. players
Thurrock F.C. players
Carshalton Athletic F.C. players
Lewes F.C. players
FC Admira Wacker Mödling players
SV Schwechat players
SKN St. Pölten players
First Vienna FC players
VfB Lübeck players
SC Weiche Flensburg 08 players
Alemannia Aachen players
FC Rot-Weiß Koblenz players
Mauritian expatriate footballers
Mauritian expatriate sportspeople in Austria
Expatriate footballers in Austria
Mauritian expatriate sportspeople in Germany
Expatriate footballers in Germany
Black British sportsmen